The 1998 MAAC men's basketball tournament was held February 27–March 2, 1998 at Pepsi Arena in Albany, New York.

Top-seeded Iona defeated  in the championship game, 90–75, to win their first MAAC men's basketball tournament.

The Gaels received an automatic bid to the 1998 NCAA tournament.

Format
All ten of the conference's members participated in the tournament field. They were seeded based on regular season conference records.

Bracket

References

MAAC men's basketball tournament
1997–98 Metro Atlantic Athletic Conference men's basketball season